Sichuan University Wangjiang Campus  Station is a metro station at Chengdu, Sichuan, China. It was opened on December 18, 2020 with the opening of Chengdu Metro Line 8. The station serves the nearby Wangjiang Campus of Sichuan University.

Gallery

References

Chengdu Metro stations
Railway stations in China opened in 2020